The South Texas Derby is a regular season series between American soccer clubs Rio Grande Valley FC Toros of Edinburg, Texas and San Antonio FC of San Antonio, Texas. Both teams compete in the Western Conference of the USL Championship, the second tier of soccer in the United States.

Rivalry 

The first match in the series was on May 7, 2016, at Toyota Field in San Antonio. RGV's Rob Lovejoy scored the first goal in the rivalry in the 69th minute. San Antonio came back from being down 0–2 but eventually lost to RGV as Lovejoy secured the win with a stoppage-time goal. Needing a win in their final regular-season match to secure a place in the 2016 USL Playoffs, San Antonio FC lost to RGV 0–3 in Edinburg. The loss kept San Antonio out of the playoffs in their inaugural season, while RGV went on to the playoffs, losing in the First Round. RGV FC took the 2016 season series with three wins, one draw, and no losses.

The 2017 USL season saw San Antonio FC earning its first win of the season, and in the Derby, against RGV on March 26, 2017. San Antonio would go on to win two out of the three meetings in the series. In a reversal from their inaugural seasons, San Antonio FC finished in second place in the Western Conference standings; making their first playoff appearance, while Rio Grande Valley FC finished in 11th place, failing to make the playoffs for the first time in their history.

The 2018 USL season was the first time that both teams failed to qualify for the playoffs. San Antonio missed out by just three points and one place in the standings, while RGV ended up in 13th place. In the Derby, 2018 was the first season that RGV failed to win a single match against San Antonio. From the last match in the 2017 season, SAFC went on a four match unbeaten streak against RGV, the team's longest in the rivalry. Beginning with the 2019 season, the rivalry began being scheduled as an equal home-away format. Since the 2019 season, both RGV and San Antonio's derby matches have also been counted in the Copa Tejas competition that pits the four USL Championship clubs from Texas to determine the best in the state.

Due to the coronavirus pandemic and the announcement of the updated competition format for the remainder of the 2020 USL Championship season, the South Texas Derby competition did not play-out as originally scheduled. Both teams were placed in Group D. The revised 2020 schedule was released on July 2 with four scheduled South Texas Derby matches in an equal home-away format.

Both clubs moved to the Mountain Division of the USL Western Conference for the 2021 USL Championship season where RGV opened the series with a 1–0 win that pulled the club even on wins with its rival at 6 apiece. After a pair of 1-1 draws, San Antonio would end the season series with a 2-1 road victory over RGV giving the Alamo City club the lead in wins over their south Texas rival. The South Texas Derby would be played once again in 2021, this time as part of the 2021 USL Championship Playoffs in the Conference Semi-final round held in San Antonio. This was the first post-season Derby between the two sides. San Antonio went on to win 3-1 over RGV which advanced them to the Conference Finals for the first time in club history.

Results 
Home team is listed on the left, away team is listed on the right. Home team's score is listed first.

Top goalscorers 

 Does not include own goals. List is sorted by last name when total goals are equal 

Competitive matches only.  Players in bold are still active players with the team.

Players who played for both clubs 

Players in bold are still active players with the team.

Notes

References 

Soccer rivalries in the United States
Sports in the Rio Grande Valley
Rio Grande Valley FC Toros
Sports in San Antonio
San Antonio FC
Soccer in Texas
USL Championship